The province of North and Central Sulawesi was a province in Indonesia that was short-lived, lasting only four years from 1960 to 1964. It was established as part of the separation of the province of Sulawesi into the province of North and Central Sulawesi and the province of South and Southeast Sulawesi. In 1964, the province of North and Central Sulawesi was separated into the province of North Sulawesi and the province of Central Sulawesi.

Governors of Sulawesi

Governors of North and Central Sulawesi

Governors After the Province of North and Central Sulawesi was Dissolved

References

Sulawesi
North and Central Sulawesi